Attack was a pop group in Huddinge in Sweden, active between 1980–1985, scoring chart successes in Sweden during the early 1980s.

Members

1980-1982
Åke Eriksson
Rosa Körberg (sister of Tommy Körberg)
Björn Uhr
Peter P.J Jägerhult

1983-1985
Åke Eriksson
Rosa Körberg
Björn Uhr
Fille Lindström

1992-1999
Åke Eriksson
Rosa Körberg
Björn Uhr
Peter P.J Jägerhult

Discography

Album
1980 - Vampyrrock
1981 - Rätt stuk
1982 - Full fart Framåt

Singles
1980 - "Du får inte komma i kväll/Vill du ha, kom å ta'"
1981 - "Kompaktmannen/Jag vill inte ner i källaren"
1981 - "Ooa hela natten/Kom fram"
1982 - "Trasnochando (Ooa hela natten)/Adelante (Kom fram)"
1982 - "Ooin in the Moonlight/Ooin in the Moonlight (instrumental version)"
1982 - "Tokyo / Tung metall"
1982 - "Dag och natt/Grönt ljus"
1982 - "Helt rätt/Dr. Kildahr"

References

External links
 Attack

1980 establishments in Sweden
1985 disestablishments in Sweden
Musical groups established in 1980
Musical groups disestablished in 1985
Swedish pop music groups